The First Federal Electoral District of Chihuahua (I Distrito Electoral Federal de Chihuahua) is one of the 300 Electoral Districts into which Mexico is divided for the purpose of elections to the federal Chamber of Deputies and one of nine such districts in the state of Chihuahua.

It elects one deputy to the lower house of Congress for each three-year legislative period, by means of the first past the post system.

District territory
Under the 2005 districting scheme, the district covers the municipalities of Ahumada, Ascensión, Guadalupe, Janos, Práxedis G. Guerrero and the southern part of the municipality of  Juárez.

The district's head town (cabecera distrital), where results from individual polling stations are gathered together and collated, is the city of  Ciudad Juárez.

Previous districting schemes

1996–2005 district
Between 1996 and 2005, the First District's territory was in the north and north-east of the state, covering the municipalities of Ahumada, Ascensión, Buenaventura, Casas Grandes, Galeana, Gómez Farías, Guadalupe, Ignacio Zaragoza, Janos, Madera, Matachí, Namiquipa, Nuevo Casas Grandes, Práxedis G. Guerrero and Temósachi; it was centred on the city of  Nuevo Casas Grandes.

1979–1996 district
Between 1979 and 1996, the First District was located in the centre of the state and was centred on the state capital, the city of Chihuahua

Deputies returned to Congress from this district

L Legislature
 1976–1979: Alberto Ramírez Gutiérrez (PRI)
LI Legislature
 1979–1982: Margarita Moreno Mena (PRI)
LII Legislature
 1982–1985: Miguel Ángel Acosta Ramos (PRI)
LIII Legislature
 1985–1988: Eduardo Turati (PAN)
LIV Legislature
 1988–1991: David Gómez Reyes (PRI)
LV Legislature
 1991–1994: Fernando Rodríguez Cerna (PRI)
LVI Legislature
 1994–1997: Manuel Russek Valles (PRI)
LVII Legislature
 1997–2000: Jeffrey Jones (PAN)
LVIII Legislature
 2000–2003: Hortencia Enríquez Ortega (PRI)
LIX Legislature
 2003–2006: José Mario Wong Pérez (PRI)
LX Legislature
 2006–2009: Enrique Serrano Escobar (PRI)

Results

References

Federal electoral districts of Mexico
Chihuahua (state)